Andrei Ruslanovich Smetanin (born 21 June 1969) is a Russian professional football coach and a former player.

Club career
He made his debut in the Soviet Top League in 1990 for FC Dynamo Moscow.

Post-playing career
From 2007 to 2010 he worked as the general director for the futsal team MFC Dynamo-2 Moscow.

Honours
 Russian Premier League champion: 1998, 1999, 2000.
 Russian Premier League runner-up: 1994.
 Russian Premier League bronze: 1992, 1993, 1997.
 Soviet Top League bronze: 1990.
 Russian Cup winner: 1995.
 Russian Cup finalist: 1997.
 Russian Second Division Zone Ural/Povolzhye best goalkeeper: 2004.

European club competitions
 UEFA Cup 1991–92 with FC Dynamo Moscow: 6 games.
 UEFA Cup 1993–94 with FC Dynamo Moscow: 1 game.
 UEFA Cup 1994–95 with FC Dynamo Moscow: 4 games.
 UEFA Cup Winners' Cup 1995–96 with FC Dynamo Moscow: 4 games.
 UEFA Cup 1996–97 with FC Dynamo Moscow: 3 games.
 UEFA Cup 1999–2000 with FC Spartak Moscow: 1 game.

References

1969 births
Living people
Sportspeople from Perm, Russia
Soviet footballers
Russian footballers
Soviet Top League players
Russian Premier League players
FC Dynamo Moscow players
FC Spartak Moscow players
FC Ural Yekaterinburg players
FC Sokol Saratov players
FC Volgar Astrakhan players
Association football goalkeepers
FC Zvezda Perm players